This is the 2004 THE–QS World University Rankings list of the top 200 universities in the world.

Top 200

Regional rankings (top 10)

Asia & Australia

Europe

North America

References

University and college rankings
2004 in education